Johnelle Terria Hunt (née DeBusk, born January 4, 1932) is an American billionaire, the widow of Johnnie Bryan Hunt, and co-founder of J.B. Hunt Transport Services, the company they started in 1961.

Early life
Hunt was born Johnelle Terria DeBusk on January 4, 1932, in Heber Springs, Arkansas. She dropped out of the University of Central Arkansas.

Career
Hunt was on the board of J.B. Hunt Transport Services, the largest publicly-owned trucking company in the US, until 2007, the year after her husband, J.B. Hunt, died.

In November 2020, Hunt had a net worth of US$3.5 billion.

Personal life
Hunt has two children and lives in Fayetteville, Arkansas. Her son Bryan Hunt is on the board of J.B. Hunt Transport Services.

References

Living people
People from Heber Springs, Arkansas
People from Fayetteville, Arkansas
American billionaires
Female billionaires
1932 births